Stereoid is the first album of the Hungarian electronic trio Compact Disco. It was released in 2009 by Hungarian independent record label CLS Records.

Track listing
 "Heartbeat"	3:23	 
 "No Escape"	3:26	 
 "Without You"	4:13	 
 "Fly or Dive"	4:08	 
 "Electropop"	3:03	 
 "I'm in Love" (Album Version)	4:14	 
 "Get it Right"	4:24	 
 "Samantha Funk"	3:46	 
 "All Night"	4:04	 
 "Horizon"	4:28	 
 "I'm in Love" (Tits & Clits Remix)

Personnel
 Behnam Lotfi - loops, grooves, effects, recording (music) (tracks 1-10), composer, lyricist, producer (tracks 1-10)
 Gábor Pál - keyboards, recording (music) (tracks 1-10), composer, lyricist, producer (tracks 1-10)
 Csaba Walkó - lead and backing vocals, recording (music) (tracks 1-10), composer, lyricist, producer (tracks 1-10)
 Gábor Némethy - recording (vocals), mixing, and mastering
 Tits & Clits - remix, mixing, mastering, and producing on track 11

References

Compact Disco albums
2009 albums